Stillingia diphtherina is a species of flowering plant in the family Euphorbiaceae. It was described in 1951. It is native to southern Mexico, Guatemala, and Honduras.

References

diphtherina
Plants described in 1951
Flora of Mexico
Flora of Guatemala
Flora of Honduras